Dorjee Khandu (19 March 1955 – 30 April 2011) was an Indian politician who served as Chief Minister of Arunachal Pradesh. He was re elected in 2009 Arunachal Pradesh Legislative Assembly elections.

Personal life
Early life
Dorjee Khandu was born in Gyangkhar Village in Tawang district, North East Frontier Agency, India to Leki Dorjee.

 Married life
Dorjee Khandu had four wives, five sons and two daughters. He was a follower of Buddhism and Donyi-Poloism.
His eldest son, Mr. Pema Khandu, is currently the chief minister of Arunachal Pradesh.

Career
Dorjee Khandu served in the Indian Army Intelligence Corps for seven years. He was awarded a gold medal for the meritorious service rendered during Bangladesh War. Later, he engaged in social activities concerned with villagers of Tawang District. In 1980, he was elected unopposed as the First ASM and served till 1983.
 1982: Chairman, Culture and Co-operative Societies.
 1983–87: Elected unopposed as District Vice President, West Kameng District Zilla Parishad 1983–87.

Political career
Popularly known as People's Chief Minister, large chunk of modern infrastructure is a product of his policies viz-a-viz. Trans-Arunachal Highway, Green field airport, Railway lines, New State civil secretariat, New Assembly Building etc. He was conferred the Karamveer Award by Arunachal Pradesh Literary Society in 2013 in recognition of his contributions to the state. 
In March 1990, he was elected unopposed to the First Legislative Assembly of Arunachal Pradesh from Thingbu-Mukto constituency. In March 1995, he was re-elected to Second Legislative Assembly of the State of Arunachal Pradesh from the same constituency. He became the Minister of State for Cooperation from 21 March 1995.
 21 September 1996, he became the Minister for Animal Husbandry & Veterinary, Dairy Development.
 1998, he was the Minister for Power from 1998–2006.
 October 1999, he was elected to third Legislative Assembly of Arunachal Pradesh. He was the Minister for Mines, Relief & Rehabilitation from 15 October 2002 to 27 July 2003.
 28 July 2003, he became the Minister for Relief & Rehabilitation and Disaster Management.
 2004, he was re-elected unopposed from Mukto constituency in the Arunachal Pradesh Legislative Assembly elections and became the minister for Power, NCER, and relief and rehabilitation.

Chief Minister of Arunachal Pradesh
On 9 April 2007, he became the sixth Chief Minister of the state, replacing Gegong Apang. Again in 2009, he was elected unopposed from the same constituency and was sworn in as the Chief Minister of the state on 25 October 2009.

Disappearance and death
On 30 April 2011, the helicopter carrying Khandu and four other people on a trip from Tawang to Itanagar disappeared. On 2 May, the aerial search for Khandu was halted due to inclement weather, necessitating a move to ground search by the Indian Army, police, SSB and the Indo-Tibetan Border Police. Personnel were searching a heavily forested 66 square kilometer section of West Kameng district, where satellites detected possible plane remnants. Witnesses said they heard a large explosion on the morning of 30 April, almost around the same time when the helicopter went missing.

On 4 May 2011, at around 11 am, remnants of the crashed helicopter were found by a group of locals. Although the crash has been blamed on the poor condition of the helicopter, a single engine four seater Eurocopter B8 provided by Pawan Hans, the helicopter was only put into service in 2010.

P Chidambaram, Home Minister of India confirmed the news of the death of Dorjee Khandu on the morning of 5 May. Earlier in a briefing Minister of External Affairs, SM Krishna said he is deeply pained by the demise of Dorjee Khandu.

The last rites of the Chief Minister were performed in his native village, Gyangkhar, in Tawang district as per Monpa Buddhist rituals. His power minister Jarbom Gamlin succeeded him as the Chief Minister, only to resign on 31 October the same year.

References

15. ∧″Who's Who 2004″-Published by Arunachal Pradesh Legislative Assembly

External links

Chief Ministers of Arunachal Pradesh
Chief ministers from Indian National Congress
Indian Buddhists
Indian Army personnel
1955 births
2011 deaths
Victims of aviation accidents or incidents in 2011
Victims of aviation accidents or incidents in India
Victims of helicopter accidents or incidents
People from Tawang district
Arunachal Pradesh district councillors
People from West Kameng district
Indian National Congress politicians
Arunachal Pradesh MLAs 1990–1995
Arunachal Pradesh MLAs 1995–1999
Arunachal Pradesh MLAs 1999–2004
Arunachal Pradesh MLAs 2004–2009
Arunachal Pradesh MLAs 2009–2014
State cabinet ministers of Arunachal Pradesh
Accidental deaths in India